This is a list of solo piano pieces by Felix Mendelssohn.

Pieces

Sonatas
Piano Sonata No.1, in E major, Op. 6 (1825, published in 1826)
Piano Sonata No.2, in G minor, Op.posth. 105 (1821)
Piano Sonata No.3, in B flat major, Op.posth. 106 (1827, published posthumously in 1868)

Songs Without Words
Lieder ohne Worte (Songs Without Words)
Book 1, Op. 19b (1829-1830) 
No. 1 Andante con moto in E major
No. 2 Andante espressivo in A minor
No. 3 Molto allegro e vivace in A major ("Hunting Song")
No. 4 Moderato in A major
No. 5 Poco agitato in F-sharp minor
No. 6 Andante sostenuto in G minor ("Venezianisches Gondellied"  [Venetian Boat Song] No. 1)
Book 2, Op. 30 (1833-1834) 
No. 1 Andante espressivo in E-flat major
No. 2 Allegro di molto in B-flat minor
No. 3 Adagio non troppo in E major
No. 4 Agitato e con fuoco in B minor
No. 5 Andante grazioso in D major
No. 6 Allegretto tranquillo in F-sharp minor ("Venezianisches Gondellied" or Venetian Boat Song No. 2)
Book 3, Op. 38 (1836-1837) 
No. 1 Con moto in E-flat major
No. 2 Allegro non troppo in C minor
No. 3 Presto e molto vivace in E major
No. 4 Andante in A major
No. 5 Agitato in A minor
No. 6 Andante con moto in A-flat major ("Duetto")
Book 4, Op. 53 (1839-1841) 
No. 1 Andante con moto in A-flat major
No. 2 Allegro non troppo in E-flat major
No. 3 Presto agitato in G minor
No. 4 Adagio in F major
No. 5 Allegro con fuoco in A minor ("Volkslied")
No. 6 Molto Allegro vivace in A major
Book 5, Op. 62 (1842-1844) 
No. 1 Andante espressivo in G major
No. 2 Allegro con fuoco in B-flat major
No. 3 Andante maestoso in E minor ("Trauermarsch")
No. 4 Allegro con anima in G major
No. 5 Andante con moto in A minor ("Venezianisches Gondellied" or Venetian Boat Song No. 3)
No. 6 Allegretto grazioso in A major ("Frühlingslied" or "Spring Song")
Book 6, Op. 67 (1843-1845)
No. 1 Andante in E-flat major
No. 2 Allegro leggiero in F-sharp minor
No. 3 Andante tranquillo in B-flat major
No. 4 Presto in C major ("Spinnerlied")
No. 5 Moderato in B minor
No. 6 Allegro non troppo in E major
Book 7, Op. 85 (1834-1845) 
No. 1 Andante espressivo in F major
No. 2 Allegro agitato in A minor
No. 3 Presto in E-flat major
No. 4 Andante sostenuto in D major
No. 5 Allegretto in A major
No. 6 Allegretto con moto in B-flat major
Book 8, Op. 102 (1842-1845) 
No. 1 Andante un poco agitato in E minor
No. 2 Adagio in D major
No. 3 Presto in C major
No. 4 Un poco agitato, ma andante in G minor
No. 5 Allegro vivace in A major ("Kinderstücke")
No. 6 Andante in C major

Miscellaneous pieces
Capriccio in F sharp minor, Op. 5 
Pièces caractéristiques for piano, Op. 7 (1827)
 No. 1 Sanft und mit Empfindung
 No. 2 Mit heftiger Bewegung
 No. 3 Kräftig und feurig
 No. 4 Schnell und beweglich
 No. 5 Ernst und mit steigender Lebhaftigkeit
 No. 6 Sehnsüchtig
 No. 7 Leicht und luftig
Rondo capriccioso in E major/E minor, Op. 14
Fantasia on "The Last Rose of Summer" in E major for piano, Op. 15 (1827)
Fantasies or Caprices for piano, Op. 16 (1829)
 No. 1 Fantasia in A minor
 No. 2 Caprice or Scherzo in E minor
 No. 3 Fantasia in E major ("The Rivulet")
Fantasia in F-sharp minor for piano, Op. 28 ("Sonate écossaise")
3 Caprices, Op. 33 (1834-1835)
 No 1. in A minor (1834)
 No 2. in E major (1834)
 No 3. in B flat minor (1835) 
Six Preludes and Fugues, Op. 35
 No. 1 Prelude and Fugue in E minor
 No. 2 Prelude and Fugue in D major
 No. 3 Prelude and Fugue in B minor
 No. 4 Prelude and Fugue in A-flat major
 No. 5 Prelude and Fugue in F minor
 No. 6 Prelude and Fugue in B-flat major
Variations sérieuses, Op. 54 (1841)
Kinderstücke [Children's pieces] for piano, Op. 72 (1842)
 No. 1 Allegro non troppo in G major
 No. 2 Andante sostenuto in E-flat major
 No. 3 Allegretto in G major
 No. 4 Andante con moto in D major
 No. 5 Allegro assai in G minor
 No. 6 Vivace in F major
Three Preludes for piano, Op. 104a (1834)
 No. 1 Prelude in B-flat major
 No. 2 Prelude in B minor
 No. 3 Prelude in D major
Three Études for piano, Op. 104b (1834-1838)
 No. 1 Étude in B-flat minor
 No. 2 Étude in F major
 No. 3 Étude in A minor
Album-leaf (Albumblatt) in E minor for piano, Op. 117, "Lied ohne Worte" (1837)
Capriccio in E major for piano, Op. 118 (1837)
Perpetuum Mobile in C major, Op. 119 
 3 Fugues 
 No. 1 Fugue in D minor
 No. 2 Fugue in D minor
 No. 3 Fugue in B minor
Scherzo in B minor (1829)
Scherzo a capriccio in F sharp minor (1835–36)
Two Musical Sketches for piano, WoO 19 (1833)
 No. 1 Andante cantabile in B-flat major
 No. 2 Presto agitato in G minor

See also
List of compositions by Felix Mendelssohn

References

 
Piano compositions by German composers
Piano compositions in the Romantic era
Lists of piano compositions by composer
Piano compositions